PMB can stand for:

 Phenylmagnesium bromide, a reagent
 p-Methoxybenzyl, in the benzyl group
 Nickname of Pietermaritzburg, KwaZulu-Natal, South Africa
 Picture Motion Browser, Sony software
 PMB (software), a library system
 Postmenopausal bleeding, a menstrual condition
 Print Measurement Bureau, a Canadian media surveying company
 Private Mail Bag, a service used by the US Postal Service
 Pro-Música Brasil, record label body
 Pierre-Marc Bouchard (born 1984), Canadian ice hockey player